Adasa is a city referred to in 1 Maccabees, being the site of the Syrian-Seleucid General Nicanor's death and Judah Maccabee's post in the battle of Adasa (during the Maccabean Revolt). It is said to be less than four miles from Beth-Horon (1 Macc 7:39).

References

Places in the deuterocanonical books
Books of the Maccabees